Batatais is a municipality in São Paulo, Brazil

Batatais may also refer to:

Batatais Futebol Clube, Brazilian football club
Batatais (footballer) (1910-1960), full name Algisto Lorenzato, Brazilian football goalkeeper
Anderson Batatais (born 1972), Brazilian football centre-back
Marcelo Batatais (born 1974), Brazilian football centre-back